Shoko Uemura (born 17 August 1993) is a Japanese professional footballer who plays as a forward for WE League club Urawa Reds.

Club career 
Uemura made her WE League debut on 2 October 2021.

References 

Japanese women's footballers
Living people
1993 births
Women's association football forwards
Urawa Red Diamonds Ladies players
WE League players
Association football people from Saitama Prefecture
People from Koshigaya, Saitama